State Forest State Park is a Colorado State Park located in Jackson and Larimer counties east of Walden, Colorado, United States. The  park was established in 1970 in the Medicine Bow Range of the Rocky Mountains.

About  of the park are forested in lodgepole pine, Douglas fir, Colorado blue spruce, aspen and other species. An unprecedented epidemic of Mountain pine beetle is currently reshaping the park's flora landscape. Wildlife in the park includes moose ("Moose is our claim to fame"), bighorn sheep, black bear, mule deer and elk. North Park is considered the moose viewing capital of Colorado, with over 600 moose to be observed year-round.

References

External links
Park website

State parks of Colorado
Protected areas of Jackson County, Colorado
Protected areas of Larimer County, Colorado
Protected areas established in 1970
1970 establishments in Colorado